Afro-Cuban Influence is an album by American jazz trumpeter and arranger Shorty Rogers which was released by RCA Victor in 1958.

Reception

Allmusic called it a "highly recommended LP".

Track listing 
 "Wuayacañanga Suite" (Carlos Vidal, Modesto Duran, Shorty Rogers) – 21:58
 "Manteca" (Chano Pozo, Dizzy Gillespie, Gil Fuller) – 9:02
 "Moon Over Cuba" (Duke Ellington, Juan Tizol) – 4:12
 "Viva Puente" (Shorty Rogers) – 3:39
 "Un Poco Loco" (Bud Powell) – 3:36

Personnel 
Shorty Rogers – flugelhorn, arranger
Buddy Childers, Don Fagerquist, Ed Leddy, Al Porcino, Ray Triscari – trumpet
Bob Enevoldsen – valve trombone 
Harry Betts, George Roberts, Frank Rosolino, Ken Shroyer – trombone
Bud Shank – flute, alto saxophone
Herb Geller – alto saxophone
Bob Cooper, Bill Holman  – tenor saxophone
Bill Hood – tenor saxophone, baritone saxophone
Chuck Gentry – baritone saxophone
Joe Mondragon – bass 
Shelly Manne – drums
Carlos Vidal, Frank Guerrero, Juan Cheda, Luis Miranda, Manuel Ochoa, Mike Pacheco, Modesto Duran, Sirelda Gonzalez – percussion, vocals

References 

Shorty Rogers albums
1958 albums
RCA Records albums
Albums arranged by Shorty Rogers